Laura Gutman, born in 1958 in Buenos Aires, Argentina, is a therapist specializing in maternity psychology.

Biography
During the last military dictatorship in Argentina, she was exiled in Paris. There she studied Learning sciences at Paris 8 University. She enrolled feminist and naturopathy movements. She was disciple of Françoise Dolto and Michel Odent. In 1988 she moved back to Buenos Aires. She started counseling young mothers on parenting. She founded the School of Parenting in Buenos Aires. Later on, she started to write books on the psychology of maternity. She has developed a new method of Psychotherapy called Human Biography Building.

Books in English
 Gutman, L. (2002). Maternity: Coming face to face with your own shadow

References

External links
 Official website (Spanish)

1958 births
Living people
Psychotherapists
Argentine women writers
Argentine feminists